The name Engelmannia has been given to two genera in biology:

Engelmannia A. Gray ex Nutt., a daisy (Asteraceae)
Engelmannia Klotzsch, a synonym for Croton